Rey Washam (born Reynolds Washam, March 14, 1961, in Austin, Texas) is a Grammy   nominated drummer  who has been performing for more than 35 years. He has collaborated with many bands, the most notable of which include: Scratch Acid, Rapeman, Ministry, the Big Boys, Helios Creed, the Didjits, Lard, and Tad and Butthole Surfers offshoot Daddy Longhead. When Jason Schwartzman of Phantom Planet left that band, Washam was hired to fill in on drums for a tour which never materialized. Washam also played jazz with a band, Euripides Pants, that recorded an unreleased album.

Washam performed with a temporarily reunited Scratch Acid in the Touch and Go Records 25th anniversary concert, which took place on September 9, 2006, in Chicago, Illinois. The Chicago show also spawned two other reunion shows: in Austin, Texas prior to the Touch and Go Records 25th anniversary concert, and September 16, 2006, in Seattle, Washington.

Rey joined the three other original members of Scratch Acid for a Fall and Winter tour in 2011.
Reynolds graduated from L.V. Berkner High School in Richardson Texas in 1979. Rey currently works as an actor under his legal name.

References

External links
An interview with Washam by Mark Prindle

1961 births
Living people
Musicians from Austin, Texas
American male drummers
American rock drummers
American industrial musicians
Noise rock musicians
Post-hardcore musicians
Ministry (band) members
Lard (band) members
Rapeman members
Scratch Acid members
20th-century American drummers